The Slovak Air Force, known since 2002 as the Air Force of the Armed Forces of the Slovak Republic, is the aviation and air defense branch of the Slovak Armed Forces. Operating 23 aircraft and 10 helicopters from three air bases : Malacky–Kuchyňa, Sliač, Prešov.  It succeeded the Czechoslovak Air Force together with the Czech Air Force in 1993. The Slovak Air Force is part of NATO Integrated Air Defense System – NATINADS.

The Slovak Air Force is tasked with the defense of the sovereign Slovak state and the support of the nation's ground troops. Following the retirement of the Mikoyan MiG-29 in 2022, 7 L-39 Albatros provide the role fast-jet capability to the air force, awaiting the delivery of American F-16 Fighting Falcon aircraft in 2024. 6 Let-410 Turbolet aircraft provide surveillance and transport capabilities, while 2 C-27 Spartan transports provide a light tactical airlift capability. The helicopter fleet consists of 9 Mil Mi-17, gradually being replaced by the UH-60 Black Hawk.

The Slovak Air Force has been under the command of Major General Róbert Tóth since January 1, 2021.

History

1939–1945 

After the division of Czechoslovakia by Nazi Germany in 1939, Slovakia was left with a small air force composed primarily of Czechoslovak combat aircraft. This force defended Slovakia against Hungary in 1939, and took part in the invasion of Poland in support of Germany. During the World War II, the Slovak Air force was charged with the defense of Slovak airspace, and, after the invasion of Russia, provided air cover for Slovak forces fighting against the Soviet Union on the Eastern Front. While engaged on the Eastern Front, Slovakia's obsolete biplanes were replaced with German combat aircraft, including the Messerschmitt Bf 109. The air force was sent back to Slovakia after combat fatigue and desertion had reduced the pilots' effectiveness. Slovak air units took part in the Slovak National Uprising against Germany from late August 1944.

1946–1992 

During this time Czechoslovakia was a member of the Eastern Bloc, allied with the Soviet Union, and from 1955 a member of the Warsaw Pact. Because of this, the Czechoslovak Air Force used Soviet aircraft, doctrines, and tactics. The types of aircraft were mostly MiGs. MiG-15, MiG-19, and MiG-21F fighters was produced in license; in the 1970s, MiG-23MF were bought, accompanied by MiG-23ML and MiG-29s in the 1980s.

During the 1980s and early 1990s, the Czechoslovak Air Force consisted of the 7th Air Army, which had air defense duties, and the 10th Air Army, responsible for ground forces support. The 7th Air Army had two air divisions and three fighter regiments, and the 10th Air Army had two air divisions and a total of six regiments of fighters and attack aircraft. There were also two reconnaissance regiments, two transport regiments, three training regiments, and two helicopter regiments.

In November 1989 Communism fell across Czechoslovakia. The two parliaments of the two new states from 1993, the Czech Republic and Slovakia, decided how to split the assets of the former air force. The assets were divided 2:1 in the Czechs' favor, and thus the Slovak Air Force was (re)formed. However the 20 MiG 29s were shared equally between the two countries.

1993–2018 

After the formal dissolution of Czechoslovakia on January 1, 1993, Czech and Slovak aircraft were divided according to each nation's population, in a ratio of nearly 2:1 in the Czech Republic's favor. The exceptions to this rule were the MiG-23's, which were given exclusively to the Czech Air force, and the MiG-29's, which were divided evenly between the two nations. Slovak bases were initially under-equipped to handle the aircraft transferred from the Czech bases, and required considerable improvements in infrastructure to facilitate the new air force. On March 1, 1995, the air force replaced the Soviet style aviation regiment organization with the western wing and squadron system. Around 2000–2002, Slovakia gradually retired many of the older aircraft, including the entire fleet of Su-22, Su-25, and MiG-21. In 2004, the flight training academy and national aerobatic demonstration team Biele Albatrosy, both based at Košice, were disbanded.

On January 19, 2006, the Slovak Air Force lost an Antonov An-24 in a crash.

On September 20, 2011, all of the remaining Mil Mi-24 gunships were retired.

In January 2014, Slovakia started discussions with the Swedish Government regarding leasing or purchasing JAS-39 Gripen aircraft to replace their MiG-29 fighters.

On April 21, 2014, Slovakia and RAC MiG signed a contract for a three years long modernization programme for the air force's MiG-29 fighters.

In April 2015, Slovak government announced it will buy nine UH-60 utility helicopters to replace its fleet of Mi-17 helicopters. The deal worth US$261 million includes also full life-cycle support for the aircraft and training for aircrews and ground personnel.

On December 12, 2018, Slovakia signed a contract to acquire 14 F-16C/D Block 70. All are to be delivered by 2025.

2022 
Following a request for military aid by Ukraine, the Slovakian Air Force provided a number of aircraft and equipment as aid. In April, this included the donation of a Soviet era S-300PMU (NATO designation: SA-10F Grumble) air defence battery, in addition to 4 Mil Mi-17 and one Mil Mi-2 helicopters, through the European Peace Facility. On 31 August 2022, the Soviet origin MiG-29s operated by the Slovak Air Force were retired. An agreement with fellow NATO members Poland and the Czech Republic was signed in order to establish joint patrols of airspace, until the delivery of American F-16s to the Slovak Air Force in 2024. In August 2022 the decision was yet to be made whether the retired MiGs would be donated to Ukrainian Air Force as military aid.

2023 
On 17 March 2023, the Slovak government approved sending its retired fleet of thirteen MiG-29 fighter jets to Ukraine.

Structure 

 Air Force Command, in Zvolen
 46th Wing, at Malacky Air Base
 Transport Squadron, with 2× C-27J Spartan, 1× L-410FG, 1× L-410UVP-E14, 4× L-410UVP-E20
 Air Traffic Provisions Battalion
 Air Traffic Control Squadron
 Maintenance Squadron
 Medical Point
 Air Range
 81st Wing, at Sliač Air Base
 1st Tactical Squadron, awaiting 12× F-16C Block 70, 2× F-16D Block 70
 2nd Tactical Squadron, with 6× L-39CM, 3× L-39ZAM
 Support Battalion
 Air Traffic Provisions Battalion
 Air Traffic Control Squadron
 Maintenance Squadron
 Medical Point
 51st Wing, at Prešov Air Base
 1st Helicopter Squadron, with 3× Mi-17M, 9× UH-60M
 2nd Helicopter Squadron, with 2× Mi-17LPZS
 Air Traffic Provisions Battalion
 Air Traffic Control Squadron
 Maintenance Squadron
 Medical Point
 11th Air Force Brigade, in Nitra
 1st Anti-aircraft Missile Group
 2nd Anti-aircraft Missile Group, with 5× 2K12M2 Kub-M2 (SA-6 Gainful)
 "Igla" Anti-aircraft Division, with 72× 9K38 Igla2 (SA-18 Grouse)
 Technical Division
 Support Battalion
 Operating Unit
 Medical Point
 2nd Air Force Brigade, in Zvolen
 Radar Surtem CAOC Uedem in Germany
 Air Force Command Support Company
 Medical Point

Aircraft

Current inventory

Retired aircraft
Previous aircraft operated by the Air Force include the MiG-21, MiG-29, Sukhoi Su-22, Sukhoi Su-25, Yakovlev Yak-40, Tupolev Tu-154, Aero L-29, Antonov An-12, Antonov An-24/An-26, Mil Mi-2, Mil Mi-24 helicopter.

Air defense

See also 
 International Fighter Pilots Academy
 Military of Slovakia
 Ground Forces of the Slovak Republic
 Slovak National Uprising
 2006 Slovak Air Force Antonov An-24 crash

References

External links 

 Official Homepage of the Slovak Air Force 
 Slovak Ministry of Defence page on the Slovak Air Force(en, sk)
 Home page of Slovakia's 1 Fighter Squadron(en, sk)
 Home page of 2nd Training Squadron, AFB Sliac(en, sk)
 Website of the former Slovak Flight demonstration team (en, sk)
 Website of the disbanded Slovak Military Flight Academy(sk)
 Scramble on the Web page for the Slovak Air Force(en)
 Aeroflight World Airforces on Slovakia(en)
 Eagles of the Tatras: The Slovak Airforce 1939 – 1945(en)

 
Military of Slovakia
Slovakia
1993 establishments in Slovakia
Military units and formations established in 1993